Hans am Ende (31 December 1864 – 9 July 1918) was a German Impressionist painter.

He was born in Trier. In 1889 he co-founded the artists' colony in Worpswede with Fritz Overbeck, Otto Modersohn, and Heinrich Vogeler. In 1895 this group exhibited in the Kunsthalle Bremen and at the Glaspalast in Munich, which brought them national recognition. In 1900 the poet Rainer Maria Rilke travelled to Worpswede and befriended the artist's colony, eventually writing essays about each of its members.

He volunteered for the army at the outbreak of the First World War, serving in an infantry regiment. On 10 April 1918 he was severely wounded near Mesen and taken to the hospital in Stettin, where he died. His grave is preserved in the Worpswede Cemetery.

See also
 List of German painters

Notes

References 
 Otto Dziobek (1922). Geschichte des Infanterie-Regiments Lübeck (3. hanseatisches) Nr. 162
 Rainer Maria Rilke (1955–66) Sämtliche Werke. Band 1–6, Band 5, Wiesbaden and Frankfurt a.M.
 Rainer Maria Rilke (2007) Worpswede: Fritz Mackensen, Otto Modersohn, Fritz Overbeck, Hans am Ende, Heinrich Vogeler. Neuausgabe Insel, Frankfurt a. M.;  10th ed. 
 Sigrid Welte-Wortmann (1987). Die ersten Maler in Worpswede, Worpsweder Verlag,

External links 
 
 Entry for Hans am Ende on the Union List of Artist Names
 
 Rainer Maria Rilke on Hans am Ende
 Exhibits and gallery of work (in German)

1864 births
1918 deaths
People from Trier
People from the Rhine Province
German Impressionist painters
Prussian Army personnel
German military personnel killed in World War I